Bosei Sports High School is a folk high school (non-degree granting educational institution for adults) in Præstø, Denmark, in the campus of the former Tokai University Boarding School in Denmark, a Japanese boarding school. This school was established by local Danish authorities in conjunction with Tokai University, which had operated the boarding school.

References

External links
 Bosei Sports High School
English

Folk high schools in Denmark
Tokai University
Buildings and structures in Vordingborg Municipality